A moon pool is a feature of marine drilling platforms, drillships and diving support vessels, some marine research and underwater exploration or research vessels, and underwater habitats, in which it is also known as a wet porch. It is an opening in the floor or base of the hull, platform, or chamber giving access to the water below, allowing technicians or researchers to lower tools and instruments into the sea. It provides shelter and protection so that even if the ship is in high seas or surrounded by ice, researchers can work in comfort rather than on a deck exposed to the elements. A moon pool also allows divers, diving bells, ROVs, or small submersible craft to enter or leave the water easily and in a more protected environment.

Moon pools can be used in chambers below sea level, especially for the use of scuba divers, and their design requires more complex consideration of air and water pressure acting on the moon pool surface.

First use in oil drilling at sea
Moon pools originated in the oil drilling industry, which uses them in drilling at sea or in lakes, to pass drilling equipment into the water from a platform or drillship. Drill pipes need to run vertically through the structure or hull, and the moon pool provides the means to do this.

The Glomar Explorer
This was a singular use of a moon pool and also possibly the largest dedicated moon pool constructed to date.

In underwater habitats

Very deep moon pools are used in underwater habitats—submerged chambers used by divers engaged in underwater research, exploration, marine salvage, and recreation. In this case, shown in part D of the diagram, there is no dry access between the chamber and the sea surface, and the moon pool is the only entry or exit to the chamber. Submerged chambers provide dry areas for work and rest without the need to ascend to the surface. This kind of submerged chamber uses the same principles as the diving bell, except they are fixed to the seafloor and may be called a wet porch, wet room, or wet bell. Sometimes the term moon pool is used to mean the complete chamber, not just the opening in the bottom and the air–water interface.

The alternative to a moon pool in an underwater habitat is the lock-out chamber, which is essentially like a fixed submarine, maintaining internal air pressures lower than ambient sea pressure down to one atmosphere, with an airlock to enable entry and exit underwater. Underwater habitats may have connected chambers with moon pools and lock-out chambers.

Examples of underwater habitats with moon pools
SEALAB II (US Navy)
 The Florida laboratory  Aquarius, where it is called a wet porch

Gallery of types

See also

References

Diving support equipment
Marine architecture
Oil platforms
Shipbuilding
Underwater habitats